Raga Asa is peculiar raga of Gurmat Sangeet Tradition. It is not being used in Indian music. There is a raga 'Majh Khamaj' in Hindustani Sangeet, but it does not resemble Asa of Gurmat Sangeet. Gurmat Sangeet is a musicology of Sikh Sacred Music, used in the Sikh holy scripture the Guru Granth Sahib. The ragas used by Sikh Gurus for Gurbani are known as Gurmat Sangeet. It is popular in the Sikh tradition from northern India and is part of daily prayers being conducted in Sikh Gurdwaras. Every raga has a strict set of rules which govern the number of notes that can be used; which notes can be used; and their interplay that has to be adhered to for the composition of a tune.

In the Guru Granth Sahib, the Sikh holy Granth (book) there are 60 Ragas of equal and independent status. Numerous Shabad Reet compositions on the base of these ragas are popular in the tradition. The Gurbani hymns under raga Asa appear in Sri Guru Granth Sahib first at page no. 8.

Aasaa has strong emotions of inspiration and courage. This Raag gives the listener the determination and ambition to put aside any excuses and to proceed with the necessary action to achieve the aim. It generates feelings of passion and zeal to succeed and the energy generated from these feelings enables the listener to find the strength from within to achieve success, even when the achievement seems difficult. The determined mood of this Raag ensures that failure is not an option and motivates the listener to be inspired.

Asa is five centuries old raga. It is introduced in classical singing styles of Gurmat Sangeet by Guru Nanak Dev Ji, the founder of Sikhism. The raga is originated from popular folk tunes of Punjab (northern India). Raga Asa belongs to Bilawal Thaat.
Asa was used by Guru Nanak, Guru Angad, Guru Amar Das, Guru Ram Das, Guru Arjan and Guru Tegh Bahadur.

The following represents the order of notes that can be used on the ascending and descending phase of the composition and the primary and secondary notes.

 Aroh: 
 Avroh: 
 Vadi: Ma
 Samvadi: Sa
 Thaat : Bilaval
 Jaati :  Audava – Sampurna
 Resting notes : Avroha ga , ni
 Time : Evening

Asa is a crooked (vakra) raga in that approaches to certain notes have to be made from a set position. Its variants as given in the Guru Granth Sahib are Kafi and Asavari, both of which have many features in common with Asa.

See also 
 Kirtan
 Raga
 Taal

References

External links 
 A Sikh Shabad in Raga Asa
 Raga Asa instrumental played with a Taus
 Gurmat Sangeet Project
 Raj Academy of Asian Music
 Sikhnet: Shabad for Printing

Hindustani ragas
Ragas in the Guru Granth Sahib